VEF, Latvian acronym for Valsts elektrotehniskā fabrika (State Electrotechnical Factory), was a manufacturer of electrical and electronic products in Riga, Latvia. It was founded in 1919. Before World War II, it manufactured a large variety of goods, including Minox — then the world's smallest camera. After the war, it was the leading communication technology producer in the Soviet Union and the largest factory in the Latvian SSR.

History
VEF was established in April 1919 as The Main Workshops of the Latvian Post and Telegraph Department ( (PTVGD)), where, initially, the five mechanics were the only employees. In 1924 the factory was moved for the first time, and in 1928 moved again to its VEF's current location. The factory buildings were built in late 19th and early 20th century and span a city block. Before World War I the buildings were owned by 1887-established Russian-Baltic factory UNION, established by Heinrich Dettmann. The company was renamed to VEF in 1932.

In 1922 PTVGD started to manufacture phones. In 1924 it started producing crystal-detector radios. In 1928 it began producing automatic telephone exchanges. They bought the license from Mix & Genest to produce small volume (for 100, 200, 300 numbers) and large volume (1000, 2000 numbers) switchboards. Telephone exchange in Riga and Latvia's populated places were upgraded with equipment manufactured by PTVGD until 1940. During the 1930s the monthly production of PTVGD included 500 phones and 400 exchanges.
By the 1930s the factory produced all electronics that had any market demand - communication devices, phones, light bulbs, cameras, irons, radios, flashlights, as well as photo paper, work-tables, and even airplanes. They also repaired cars.

VEF entered the world market in 1936 with the development of the Minox subminiature camera, designed by Walter Zapp. It was the world's smallest camera at the time.

Between 1928 and 1933 VEF also produced a small, inexpensive car.

During World War II the factory was looted and several buildings were destroyed by explosions. The factory was repaired after the war and it quickly recovered. During the 1960s VEF produced seven radio receivers and five phones every minute and two out of three phones in Soviet Union were produced by VEF. It also manufactured highly demanded transistor-based radios "Spīdola" and in the 1970s — "VEF".

During the Soviet period, VEF specialized in electronics and was a part of Latvia's electronic industry, which supplied the former Soviet Union with telecommunications equipment and electronics for the military. The five largest state companies were VEF, Radiotehnika, Elfa, Komutators and Elar (which produced components for the other four). In its peak in 1991, VEF employed 20,000 people. Its best known products were telephones, telephone exchanges and radios.

The Latvian electronics industry had trouble competing with Western companies when the markets were opened in the early 1990s. Cited problems included poor service and product quality. Attempts to restructure these companies were not successful and their combined production fell more than 90% between 1993 and 1997. VEF was divided into six smaller companies, most of which no longer exist. Three remaining ones, VEF un Ko, VEF TELEKOM and VEF Radiotehnika RRR, employ between 100 and 200 people each.

In 1999 the factory was privatized and reorganized.

Product line-up

Cameras
 Minox

Radios
 Spīdola
 Vega VEF
 VEF Latvia
 VEF Abava

Phones
 VEF-TA
The VEF-TA had many different versions that ranged from classic style rotary phones to modern push button keypad.

Computers
 VEF ORMIKA
 VEF-1022
 VEF-MIKRO 1024
 VEF-MIKRO 1025

Computer hardware
 Mikro 6025 computer keyboard
 Mikro 5625 – 5.25" floppy disk reader

Aircraft
 VEF Irbītis I-11
 VEF Irbītis I-12
 VEF Irbītis I-14
 VEF Irbītis I-15
 VEF Irbītis I-16
 VEF Irbītis I-17
 VEF Irbītis I-18
 VEF Irbītis I-19
 VEF JDA-10M

Motorcycle
 Pandera (prototype, built 1938)

See also
 Minox
 FC Daugava Riga

References

External links

  
 VEF-Minox cameras
 VEF camera serial numbers
 History of VEF 
 Catalogue of VEF factory products with prices, pictures and descriptions, year 1937 

Manufacturing companies based in Riga
Electronics companies of Latvia
Aircraft manufacturers of Latvia
Car manufacturers of Latvia
Electronics companies of the Soviet Union
Photography in Latvia
Electronics companies established in 1919
Electronics companies disestablished in 1999
Soviet brands
Latvian brands
Companies nationalised by the Soviet Union
1919 establishments in Latvia
1999 disestablishments in Latvia